Mental distress or psychological distress encompasses the symptoms and experiences of a person's internal life that are commonly held to be troubling, confusing or out of the ordinary. Mental distress can potentially lead to a change of behavior, affect a person's emotions in a negative way, and affect their relationships with the people around them.

Certain traumatic life experiences (such as bereavement, stress, lack of sleep, use of drugs, assault, abuse, or accidents) can induce mental distress. Those who are members of vulnerable populations might experience discrimination that places them at increased risk for experiencing mental distress as well. This may be something which resolves without further medical intervention, though people who endure such symptoms longer term are more likely to be diagnosed with mental illness. This definition is not without controversy as some mental health practitioners would use the terms "mental distress" and "mental disorder" interchangeably. Some users of mental health services prefer the term "mental distress" in describing their experience as they feel it better captures that sense of the unique and personal nature of their experience, while also making it easier to relate to, since everyone experiences distress at different times. The term also fits better with the social model of disability.

Differences from mental disorder
Some psychiatrists may use these two terms "mental distress" and "mental disorder" interchangeably. However, it can be argued that there are fundamental variations between mental distress and mental disorder. "Mental distress" has a wider scope than the related term "mental illness", which refers to a specific set of medically defined conditions. A person in mental distress may exhibit some of the broader symptoms described in psychiatry, without actually being ‘ill’ in a medical sense. People with mental distress may also exhibit temporary symptoms on a daily basis, while patients diagnosed with mental disorder may potentially have to be treated by a psychiatrist.

Types
The following are types of major mental distress:
 Anxiety disorder
 Post-traumatic stress disorder (PTSD)
 Depression
 Bipolar disorder
 Schizophrenia

Symptoms and causes
The symptoms for mental distress include a wide range of physical to mental conditions. Physical symptoms may include sleep disturbance, anorexia (lack of appetite), loss of menstruation for women, headaches, chronic pain, and fatigue. Mental conditions may include difficulty in anger management, compulsive/obsessive behavior, a significant change in social behavior, a diminished sexual desire, and mood swings.

Minor mental distress cases are caused by stress in daily problems, such as forgetting your car keys or being late for an event. However, the major types of mental distress (see section above) can be caused by other important factors. It is important to distinguish between Chemical imbalances in the brain is one of the causes that happen when there is a disequilibrium of chemicals inside the brain's neural pathways, that can lead to irrational decisions and emotional pain. For example when your brain lacks serotonin, a chemical primary in regulating a brain's functioning, this deficiency of serotonin can lead to depression, appetite changes, aggression, and anxiety. A second cause for mental distress can be exposure to severely distressing experiences, such as life threatening situations and experiences. A third cause, although in very rare cases, can be inheritance. Some research has shown that very few people may have the genetics for the potential to develop mental distress. However, there are many factors that must be accounted for. Mental distress is not a contagious disease that can be caught like the common cold. Mental distress is a psychological condition.

In the United States

African-Americans
The social disparities associated with mental health in the Black community have remained constant over time. According to the Office of Minority Health, African Americans are 30% more likely than European Americans to report serious psychological distress. Moreover, Black people are more likely to have Major Depressive Disorder, and communicate higher instances of intense symptoms/disability. For this reason, researchers have attempted to examine the sociological causes and systemic inequalities which contribute to these disparities in order to highlight issues for further investigation.  Nonetheless, much of the research on the mental well-being of Black people are unable to separate race, culture, socioeconomic status, ethnicity, or behavioural and biological factors. According to Hunter and Schmidt (2010), there are three distinct beliefs embraced by Black people which speak to their socio-cultural experience in the United States: racism, stigma associated with mental illness, and the importance of physical health. African Americans are less likely to report depression due to heavy social stigma within their community and culture. All of these social aspects of mental health can create a lot of distress. Therefore, discrimination within the healthcare community and larger society, attitudes related to mental health, and general physical health contribute largely to the mental well-being of Black people.

There are also disparities with mental health when it comes to Black women. One of the reasons why Black women tend to hesitate when it comes to mental health support and treatment is the aura of the Strong Black Woman schema or S.B.W. According to Watson and Hunter, Various scholars have traced the origins of the S.B.W. race-gender schema to slavery and have suggested that the schema persists because of the struggles that African-American women continue to experience, such as financial hardship, racism, and sexism. Watson and Hunter state that due to the Strong Black Woman schema, Black women have a tendency to handle tough and difficult situations alone.

African-American youth 
Comparable to their adult counterparts, Black adolescents experience mental health disparities. The primary reasons for this have been stipulated to be discrimination, inadequate treatment, and underutilization of mental health services, though Black youth have been shown to have higher self-esteem than their white counterparts. Similarly, children of immigrants, or second-generation Americans, often encounter barriers to optimal mental well-being. Discrimination and its effects on mental health are evident in adolescents’ ability to achieve in school and overall self-esteem. Researchers are unable to pinpoint exact causes for Black teenagers’ underutilization of mental health services.  One study attributed this to using alternative methods of support instead of formal treatments. Moreover, Black youth used other means of support, such as peers and spiritual leaders. This demonstrates that Black teens are uncomfortable disclosing personal matters to formal supports. It is difficult to decipher if this is cultural or a youth-related issue, as most teens do not choose to access formal supports for their mental health needs.

Common stigma among immigrants 

"Mental health stigma, particularly personal stigma, is important because those who hold stigma beliefs are less willing to obtain the needed treatment (1-9). Often due to stigma, individuals will avoid treatment until the disorder is nearly incapacitating. This avoidance is particularly pronounced in members of ethnic minority groups because they are less likely to seek mental health treatment than those of European Americans [e.g., Ref. (4, 10-12)]. Expressly, Immigrants who hold personal stigma against mental illness are less likely to seek treatment. Its often that immigrants feel stigmatized because they're already undocumented which makes them feel embarrassed, causing them to refrain from treatment.

Demographic and societal factors
There has been a history of disparity and exclusion in regards to the treatment of Black Americans which consists of slavery, imprisonment in the criminal justice system, the inability to vote, marry, attend school, or own property amongst other factors. These factors have attributed to the increase of mental distress in the Black community and due to the lack of resources afforded/known in the community also leads to a lack of resources and treatments available for members of the community to seek and receive some for of help.

LGBTQ+ Community
Those who identify as part of the LGBTQ+ community have a higher risk of experiencing mental distress, most likely as a result of continued discrimination and victimization. Members of this population are often confronted with derogatory and hateful comments (physically and/or through social media). This discrimination has the potential of affecting their feelings of self-worth and confidence, leading to anxiety, depression, and even suicidality. It is for this reason that members of the LGBTQ+ community may experience higher rates of mental distress than their cisgender and heterosexual counterparts. Along with the increased risk of experiencing mental distress, members of this community may refrain from seeking mental health care due to past discrimination by medical professionals. In addition to the lack of knowledge and research with this population, this group is marginalized due to the lack of funding as most of the funds go to campaigns for the younger LGBTQ+ population.

A study published in 2021 found that "LGBTQ+ students experienced more bullying and psychological distress".

References

Further reading

External links 
Mental Distress Changes

Psychological stress